Daniela Kovářová (born 17 November 1964) is a Czech politician who served as Minister of Justice in the caretaker government of Jan Fischer from 2009 to 2010.

References 

1964 births
Justice ministers of the Czech Republic
Living people
Politicians from Ostrava
Communist Party of Czechoslovakia politicians
Czech women lawyers
Women government ministers of the Czech Republic
Civic Democratic Party (Czech Republic) Government ministers
Female justice ministers
Masaryk University alumni
20th-century Czech lawyers
21st-century Czech lawyers